Edward Baily (1852–1941) was an English cricketer.

Edward Baily may also refer to:
Edward Hodges Baily (1788–1867), English sculptor
Eddie Baily (1925–2010), English footballer

See also
Edward Bailey (disambiguation)
Edward Bayley (disambiguation)